The women's singles event  in bowling at the 2009 World Games took place from 21 to 22 July at the Happy Bowling Alley.

Competition format
A total of 23 athletes entered the competition. Best ten athletes from preliminary round qualifies to the round-robin. In round-robin each player plays ten matches. For a win player gets 10 points and for a draw 5 points. Total pins and bonus points are counted as final result. From this stage the best three athletes advances to the finals.

Results

Preliminary

Round-robin

Finals

References

External links
 Results on IWGA website

Bowling at the 2009 World Games